The 2022 World Allround Speed Skating Championships were held at the Vikingskipet in Hamar, Norway, on 5 and 6 March 2022.

Schedule
All times are local (UTC+1).

Medal summary

Medal table

Medalists

References

External links
Official website

 
World Allround Speed Skating
World Allround Championships
2022 Allround Speed Skating Championships
World Allround Speed Skating
2022 World Allround Speed Skating Championships
2022 Sprint